United States–Yugoslavia relations were the historical foreign relations of the United States with both Kingdom of Yugoslavia (1919 –1941) and Socialist Federal Republic of Yugoslavia (1945–1992). During the existence of the SFRY, relations oscillated from mutual ignorance, antagonism to close cooperation, and significant direct American engagement. The United States was represented in Yugoslavia by its embassy in Belgrade and consulate general in Zagreb.

History

Kingdom of Serbia

The United States recognized the Kingdom of Serbia as a sovereign nation on October 14, 1881, with the signing of consular and commercial agreements. On November 10, 1882, U.S. Consul General Eugene Schuyler presented his credentials to the government of Serbia. At this time, the American Legation in Belgrade was established, though Schuyler was resident at Athens. U.S. and Serbian officials first made overtures to establish diplomatic relations in 1867, but it was not until 1881, three years after the country gained its independence from the Ottoman Empire, that the United States officially recognized the Kingdom of Serbia.

On October 14, 1881, both countries signed two treaties. The first was the Treaty on Commercial Relations to facilitate and develop commercial relations between the two countries signed by U.S. Chargé d’Affaires and Consul-General at Bucharest Eugene Schuyler and Serbian Minister of Foreign Affairs Čedomilj Mijatović. The second treaty was the Convention on Rights, Privileges, and Immunities of Consular Officers. This agreement defined and regulated the rights, immunities, and privileges of each state’s consular officers. On October 25, 1901, the United States and the Kingdom of Serbia signed a Treaty on Extradition in Belgrade. The treaty promoted justice and confirmed friendly relations between the two nations, and was negotiated by U.S. Minister Charles Spencer Francis and Serbian Minister of Foreign Affairs Michel V. Vouïtch.

Interwar period
The Kingdom of Yugoslavia was created in the aftermath of the World War I under the influence of the Fourteen Points self-determination ideas by the Woodrow Wilson administration. The United States was the first country to diplomatically recognize Yugoslavia.

World War II
During World War II in Yugoslavia, the United States initially supported the royalist Yugoslav government in exile. When the Nazis invaded Yugoslavia in the spring of 1941, the United States decisively supported the Chetniks in the first years of the war. This however changed once British sources recognized Yugoslav Partisans as the only significant resistance movement which will rise to become the most effective anti-Axis resistance movement during the war.

Initial postwar years
In the initial period after the war relations between the two countries were poor with Yugoslavia being perceived as the closest Soviet ally, and the country in which Communist party gained power without any significant Soviet support. This phase lasted in a short period after the end of the World War II in 1945 and before the beginning of the Cold War in 1947. This period was characterized by Soviet conciliatory diplomacy towards the West and much more belligerent Yugoslav foreign policy involved in issues such as the Free Territory of Trieste and Greek Civil War. Relations were further strained when two USAF C-47 Skytrain cargo aircraft were shot down over Yugoslavia in the space of two weeks. At the time, relations with United States were given lower priority to country's relations with United Kingdom.

Relations after 1948

The 1948 Tito-Stalin split represented the major turning point in the relations of United States and the new socialist republic. Yugoslavia first requested assistance from the United States in summer 1948. The Truman administration decided to provide substantial aid, loans and military assistance to Yugoslavia despite some concerns caused by earlier relations. Tito received US backing in Yugoslavia's successful 1949 bid for a seat on the United Nations Security Council, against Soviet opposition. In 1949, the United States provided loans to Yugoslavia, and in 1950 the loans were increased and followed by large grants and military aid. Even though the Yugoslavs initially avoided asking for military aid believing that it would be a pretext for a Soviet invasion, by 1951 Yugoslav authorities became convinced that Soviet attack was inevitable and Yugoslavia was included in the Mutual Defense Assistance program. The United States recognized strategic importance of an independent and successful socialist Yugoslavia as a subversive model for other states which were part of the Eastern Bloc.

The Yugoslav diplomacy dealt successfully with the shifts in the focus of American policy from Kennedy's "Grand Design," Johnson's "building bridges" appeal, Nixon's personal diplomacy, to Carter's focus on the human rights. Yugoslavia pursued a highly independent foreign policy and maintained leadership of the international Nonaligned movement that created a competing ideology and challenged the two superpowers.

Yugoslav crisis, breakup and wars

In the initial stage of the Yugoslav crisis and the breakup of Yugoslavia at the end of the Cold War the United States were strong advocates of Yugoslav integrity. At the same time, Washington believed the crisis was an issue for Europe to resolve. Failure of the European Community and subsequently the European Union to deal with the Yugoslav Wars led to significant American involvement in the region. In this process Presidency of Bill Clinton provided security guarantees and efforts for smaller and weaker former Yugoslav republics of Bosnia and Herzegovina and North Macedonia. This led to some frictions with Croatia and significant one with the Serbia and Montenegro (which US rejected to recognize as the sole successor to Socialist Yugoslavia) and Bosnian Serbs which escalated in 1995 Operation Deliberate Force and 1999 NATO bombing of Yugoslavia and lasted all up until the overthrow of Slobodan Milošević.

See also
Yugoslavia and the Non-Aligned Movement
Yugoslavia–European Communities relations
Bosnia and Herzegovina–United States relations
Croatia–United States relations
Kosovo–United States relations
Montenegro–United States relations
North Macedonia–United States relations
Serbia–United States relations
Slovenia–United States relations
Yugoslav Americans
Bosnian Americans
Croatian Americans
Macedonian Americans
Serbian Americans
Slovene Americans
Montenegrin Americans

References

Further reading
 Blum, Robert M. "Surprised by Tito: The anatomy of an intelligence failure." Diplomatic History 12.1 (1988): 39-57. Washington did not predict the split between Toto and Stalin in 1948.
 Brands Jr, Henry W. "Redefining the Cold War: American Policy toward Yugoslavia, 1948–60." Diplomatic History 11.1 (1987): 41-53. online
 Eskridge-Kosmach, Alena N. "Yugoslavia and US Foreign Policy in the 1960–1970s of the 20th Century." Journal of Slavic Military Studies 22.3 (2009): 383-418.
 Gallagher, Charles R. "The United States and the Vatican in Yugoslavia, 1945–50." in Religion and the Cold War (Palgrave Macmillan, London, 2003) pp. 118–144.
 Jensen-Eriksen, Niklas. "No room for neutrality?: The uncommitted European nations and the economic Cold War in the 1950s." in Small and Medium Powers in Global History (Routledge, 2018) pp. 213–230. online
 Kent, Robert'Bo. "Banking On Belgrade: Nixon’s Foreign Aid Policy With Yugoslavia (1970-1974)." Voces Novae 12.1 (2020): 3+ online.
 Kousoulas, D. George. "The Truman Doctrine and the Stalin-Tito Rift: A Reappraisal." South Atlantic Quarterly 72 (1973): 427-439.
 Lazic, Milorad. Unmaking Détente: Yugoslavia, the United States, and the Global Cold War, 1968–1980 (2022) online
 Lees, Lorraine M. Keeping Tito Afloat: The United States, Yugoslavia, and the Cold War (1997) online review. 
 Lees, Lorraine M. "The American decision to assist Tito, 1948–1949." Diplomatic History 2.4 (1978): 407-422. online
 Mehta, Coleman. "The CIA Confronts the Tito-Stalin Split, 1948–1951." Journal of Cold War Studies 13.1 (2011): 101-145.
 Niebuhr, Robert Edward. The Search for a Cold War Legitimacy: Foreign Policy and Tito's Yugoslavia (Brill, 2018).
 Niebuhr, Robert. "In the Shadow of Transition: US-Yugoslav Relations, 1966 to 1980." Breaking Down Bipolarity: Yugoslavia's Foreign Relations during the Cold War ed. by Martin Previšić (2021) pp: 103+.
 Orešković, Luka. "US-Yugoslav Relations under Kissinger." Politička misao: Časopis za politologiju 50.5 (2013): 77-98. online in English

 
Yugoslavia
Bilateral relations of Yugoslavia
Yugoslavia
Yugoslavia
Yugoslavia
Yugoslavia
Yugoslavia
Yugoslavia
Yugoslavia
Yugoslavia